Francesco Bissolo (1470-72 - 20 April 1554) was a Venetian painter of the Renaissance. He is also known as Pier Francesco Bissolo.

He is described as a pupil of Giovanni Bellini. He painted a Christ exchanging crown of thorns for crown of gold with St. Catherine for the church of il Redentore, now at the Gallerie dell'Accademia in Venice, and a Santa Giustina in Treviso cathedral. He painted a Holy Family with donor in landscape found at the Dayton Art Institute in Ohio, United States.

He died in the contrada of  S. Marciliano on 20 April 1554 after six months of illness.

References

People from Treviso
15th-century Italian painters
Italian male painters
16th-century Italian painters
Painters from Venice
Renaissance painters
1554 deaths
Year of birth unknown
1470 births